The Hand in the Trap is a 1961 Argentine film directed by Leopoldo Torre Nilsson and starring Francisco Rabal, Elsa Daniel and Leonardo Favio. It was entered into the 1961 Cannes Film Festival, where it won the FIPRESCI Prize.

In a survey of the 100 greatest films of Argentine cinema carried out by the Museo del Cine Pablo Ducrós Hicken in 2000, the film reached the 17th position. In a new version of the survey organized in 2022 by the specialized magazines La vida útil, Taipei and La tierra quema, presented at the Mar del Plata International Film Festival, the film reached the 47th position.

Cast 
Elsa Daniel - Laura Lavigne
Francisco Rabal - Cristóbal Achával
Leonardo Favio - Miguel
María Rosa Gallo - Inés Lavigne
Berta Ortegosa - Laura's Mother
Hilda Suárez - Lisa Lavigne
Enrique Vilches - Postman

References

External links 

1961 films
1960s Spanish-language films
1961 drama films
Argentine black-and-white films
Films directed by Leopoldo Torre Nilsson
1960s Argentine films